"One & Only" is a song recorded by South Korean boy group Astro. It was digitally released on February 23, 2020, by Fantagio Music and distributed by Interpark, and physically on March 13, 2020 as a limited edition. It's the group's first single album.

Composition 
The song was written by all the members of the group, Obros and zomay. It was produced by Obros, zomay, BigGun, Erskineville, alongside members Rocky, Jin Jin and MJ.

Release 
The song was released on February 23, 2020, through several music portals, including MelOn and Apple Music.

It was released as a CD single on March 13, 2020 in South Korea and on March 15 in Japan.

Commercial performance 
The song failed to enter the main Gaon Digital Chart, but debuted and peaked at number 138 on the componing Download Chart.

The single album debuted and peaked at number 4 on the Gaon Album Chart, for the week ending March 14, 2020. It was the 9th best-selling album in March 2020 with 30,000 copies sold. The album sold 13,770 copies in its first week.

Track listing

Charts

Release history

References 

2020 singles
2020 songs